Theodore Williams may refer to:
 Theodore J. Williams, American engineer
 Theodore Chickering Williams, American Unitarian pastor and hymnwriter
 Ted Williams (Theodore Samuel Williams), American baseball player and manager
 Ted Williams (media personality) (Theodore Fred Williams), American announcer and radio personality